HegartyMaths is an educational subscription tool used by schools in the United Kingdom. It is sometimes used as a replacement for general mathematics homework tasks. Its creator, Colin Hegarty, was the UK Teacher of the Year in 2015 and shortlisted for the Varkey Foundation's Global Teacher Prize in 2016. .

Usage
HegartyMaths covers a variety of topics and has 943 tasks to complete.
A task includes an educational video  with an explanation and examples on the topic. Afterwards, there is a quiz to complete, containing topic specific questions. The site is regularly updated and more topics added to keep up with the GCSE mathematics curriculum. Students can complete tasks by themselves, or teachers can assign these tasks to students to complete as homework or for revision purposes and then track the student's progress.

History
HegartyMaths was created by co-founders and teachers Colin Hegarty and Brian Arnold. In 2011 they started to make maths videos on YouTube to support their own classes with maths homework and revision. Since the videos were freely available on YouTube, students from all over the country and the world started using the videos too. In 2012, Colin won £15,000 of funding from education charity SHINE, through its Let Teachers SHINE competition, to make a website to host the videos and make more content. The original website, launched on 12 July 2013, was called mathswebsite.com. It was built to contain free maths videos to assist students in revision and is still accessible today.

In February 2016, a new site was launched: HegartyMaths.com . In 2019, Colin Hegarty sold HegartyMaths to Sparx (a company selling revision GCSE packages), for an undisclosed sum. Colin became part of the leadership team for Sparx and continued to lead development on HegartyMaths.

References

External links
hegartymaths.com
mathswebsite.com

British educational websites
Mathematics education in the United Kingdom